Nymphicula xanthocostalis is a moth in the family Crambidae. It was described by David John Lawrence Agassiz in 2014. It is found in Irian Jaya in New Guinea.

The wingspan is about 13 mm. The base of the forewings is brown, mixed with ochreous. The costa is yellow and the antemedian fascia is yellow in the costal half and whitish beneath. The base of the hindwings is fuscous with a white subbasal fascia and a silver-grey tornal spot.

Etymology
The species name refers to the yellow costa of the forewings.

References

Nymphicula
Moths described in 2014